"Baby, Now That I've Found You" is a song written by Tony Macaulay and John MacLeod, and performed by the Foundations. Part of the song was written in the same bar of a Soho tavern where Karl Marx is supposed to have written Das Kapital. The lyrics are a plea that an unnamed subject not break up with the singer.

Original recording and the Foundations 
In 1967 the Foundations released the song as their début single. After receiving airplay on the newly launched BBC Radio 1, it met with great success, becoming a number 11 hit on the Billboard Hot 100 and topping the UK Singles Chart for two weeks in November 1967. The song also reached number 1 on the Canadian RPM magazine charts on 10 February 1968.

Another version of the song was recorded by the Foundations in 1968, featuring Colin Young, Clem Curtis' replacement. This was on a Marble Arch album that featured newer stereo versions of their previous hits.

Clem Curtis, the original lead singer of the band, recorded his own version which was released on the Opium label OPIN 001 as a 7" single and a 12" version OPINT001 in 1987. In the late 1980s, Clem Curtis and Alan Warner teamed up to recut "Baby, Now That I've Found You" and "Build Me Up Buttercup", as well as other hits of the Foundations.

Top Banana, a 1980s pop band from Puerto Rico, also recorded the song.

Chart performance

Weekly charts

Year-end charts

Alison Krauss version

In 1995, American bluegrass-country singer Alison Krauss released the song as a single from her compilation album Now That I've Found You: A Collection. Her version appeared in the Australian comedy film, The Castle. It peaked at number 49 on the Billboard Hot Country Singles & Tracks chart. The song won the 1996 Grammy Award for Best Female Country Vocal Performance.

Charts

Weekly charts

Awards and nominations

Other versions
The song has been covered by a number of other artists. One of the earlier versions was a rocksteady version recorded by Alton Ellis for his 1967 album Sings Rock and Soul. Lana Cantrell recorded it for her 1968 Lana album. The same year The Marble Arch Orchestra recorded an instrumental version of the song for their album Tomorrow's Standards. In 1978 Donny and Marie Osmond recorded it for the soundtrack album for their film Goin' Coconuts. The song was also recorded by Dan Schafer, in 1977 on Tortoise International Records, an RCA Records subsidiary.

In March 2012, this version was included on the compilation album, Perhaps..the Very Best of Dan Schafer.

In the Philippines the song was recorded by MYMP for their album MYMP Live at the Music Museum. South American artist Daniel Boaventura has also recorded a version which appears on his Songs 4 U album.

Use in film
The Foundations' recording of the song appeared on the soundtrack to the film Shallow Hal. The Alison Krauss version was featured in the 1997 Australian comedy, The Castle. Her rendition was also featured in the end credits of the 2001 film Delivering Milo.

Singles released
 The Foundations – "Baby, Now That I've Found You" / "Come on Back to Me", PYE 7N 17366 (UK), 1967
 The Foundations – "Baby, Now That I've Found You" / "Build Me Up Buttercup", Flashbacks FBS6 (UK)
 The Foundations – "Build Me Up Buttercup" / "Baby, Now That I've Found You", Eric 192
 Big Ben (Ben Atkins) – "Baby, Now That I've Found You" / "Would I Better Gone ?", Enterprise ENA-9061, 1972
 Vicki Sue Robinson – "Baby, Now That I've Found You" / "Thanks A Million", RCA 10282, 1975
 Dan Schafer – "Baby, Now That I've Found You", RCA/Tortoise International, Inc VB 11292, 1977
 Clem Curtis & The Foundations –  "Baby Now That I've Found You" (Extended Version) / "Baby Now That I've Found You" (7" Version), Baby Now That I've Found You (Busk Mix) Opium Records OPINT 001, 1987
 Any Trouble – "Baby, Now That I've Found You" / "Bricks & Mortar", EMI America EA 166, (US) 1984
 Alison Krauss & Union Station – "Baby, Now That I've Found You" / "Oh, Atlanta" / "Every Time You Say Goodbye", CRCDS 4 (Holland), 1995 (CD single)
 Lauren Waterworth – "Baby, Now That I've Found You" / "Baby, Now That I've Found You"

References

1967 debut singles
1995 singles
The Foundations songs
EMI America Records singles
Pye Records singles
RCA Records singles
Rounder Records singles
Uni Records singles
RPM Top Singles number-one singles
UK Singles Chart number-one singles
Alison Krauss & Union Station songs
Songs written by John Macleod (songwriter)
Songs written by Tony Macaulay
1967 songs